The discography of Belle and Sebastian, a Scottish indie pop band, features twelve studio albums, three compilation albums, four live albums, two box sets, nine extended plays (EPs), 21 singles and one DVD. It also includes a variety of demos and non-album singles, as well as two DJ mix compilations.

Studio albums

Compilation albums

Live albums

Box sets

EPs

1 Charted at number 1 on the UK Indie Chart.

Singles

Other

Miscellaneous songs
 "O come, O come, Emmanuel" (traditional) on the Xfm charity compilation It's A Cool, Cool Christmas, released 20 November 2000 on Jeepster Records
 "Final Day" (Young Marble Giants cover) on the Rough Trade 25th-anniversary compilation Stop Me If You Think You've Heard This One Before, released 23 September 2003 on Rough Trade Records
 "Poupée de cire, poupée de son" (live France Gall cover) on the Fans Only DVD, released 20 October 2003 on Jeepster Records
 "Casaco Marron(sic)" (Trio Esperança cover) on the Belle & Sebastian-compiled album Late Night Tales: Belle & Sebastian, released on 27 February 2006 on Azuli Records, and as a limited-edition 7-inch vinyl single (backed with David Shrigley's spoken-word piece "When I Was a Little Girl") released 13 February 2006, also on Azuli
 "The Monkeys Are Breaking Out the Zoo", a children's song on the Save the Children charity album Colours Are Brighter, released 16 October 2006 on Rough Trade Records
 "Are You Coming Over For Christmas?", released December, 2007 on Belle and Sebastian's official website and Myspace profile.
 "Crash" (Primitives cover), released in 2012 as part of the Late Night Tales: Belle and Sebastian Vol. II compilation.

DVDs
 Fans Only (2003)

Notes

See also
 List of bands from Glasgow
 God Help the Girl

References

External links
 Official Website
 Belle and Sebastian on Matador Records
 Belle and Sebastian on Rolling Stone

Alternative rock discographies
Discographies of British artists
Pop music group discographies
Rock music group discographies
Discography